Christian Brothers' High School, Lewisham (also known as CBHS Lewisham), is a private Roman Catholic comprehensive single-sex secondary day school for boys, located in Lewisham, an inner-western suburb of Sydney, New South Wales, Australia. Established in 1891 by the Christian Brothers, the school has a non-selective enrolment policy and currently caters for approximately 1,350 boys from Year 5 to Year 12. The school is the oldest of the Christian Brothers schools operating in Sydney.

Principals 

The following individuals have served as Principal of Christian Brothers' High School, Lewisham:

Crest and motto 
The school motto Conanti Corona, translates as "A crown to the one who strives", which is used as an expression to help students to try their best in all aspects of life. The school crest is adapted from the Christian Brothers’ crest, highlighting the Celtic Cross and the Irish heritage of the Christian Brothers. The crest also contains the two symbols for the first and last letters of the Latin alphabet, symbolising learning and knowledge.

Notable alumni 

Alumni of Christian Brothers' High School, Lewisham are traditionally known as the "Old Boys".

Arts and letters
 Ron Blair, playwright
 Gordon Elliott, journalist and producer
 Leo Schofield , journalist and food critic
 Greg Sheridan , journalist 
 Francis Webb, poet
 David Wenham , actor

Medicine and science
 Victor Chang , heart surgeon

Military
 John Bernard MacKey  (1936) - military man given the Commonwealth's highest honour for bravery

Politics, public service and the law
 The Hon John Aquilina , politician, a former Speaker of the NSW Legislative Assembly, and a former Minister for Education and Member for Blacktown and Riverstone;
 George Brandis , former Attorney-General of Australia and Leader of the Government in the Senate
 Steve Doszpot , politician, and Member of the ACT Legislative Assembly
 Brian McGowan, politician, a member of the New South Wales Legislative Assembly
 Sir Edward McTiernan Judge of High Court of Australia
 Justice Kevin Frederick O'Leary , the Chief Justice of the Supreme Court of the Northern Territory;
 The Hon Terry Sheahan , a former NSW Attorney General and Member for Burrinjuck.
The Hon Harry Woods, Member Federal House of Representatives, Member NSW Legislative Assembly, Minister Local Government, Regional development, Rural Affairs.

Sport
 Paul Akkary, Newtown Jets rugby league player
 Raphael Bove, footballer
 Jeremy Bray, an Irish cricketer
 Steve Gearin, a professional rugby league footballer
 Roger Hartigan, a test cricket player
 Solomon Haumono, a professional rugby league footballer and professional boxer
 Brett Holman, footballer
 Andrew Koczka, footballer
 Andrew Lomu, a professional rugby league footballer
 Martin Mulligan, tennis player
 Paul Osborne, a professional rugby league footballer; politician, Schoolboy Player of the Year Award 1984
Kurtis Patterson, Australian test cricket player.
 Nathan Peats, a professional rugby league footballer for the Gold Coast Titans
 Tim Pickup, a professional rugby league footballer and test representative.
 Joe Reaiche, Sydney Roosters rugby league player
 Shane Rigon, a professional rugby league footballer
 Michael Speechley, a professional rugby league footballer
 Greg Stafford, an AFL player for Sydney Swans and Richmond Tigers
 Marco Tilio, a A-League player for Melbourne City

See also 

 List of Catholic schools in New South Wales
 Catholic education in Australia

References

External links
CBHS Lewisham Website

Catholic secondary schools in Sydney
Catholic primary schools in Sydney
Congregation of Christian Brothers secondary schools in Australia
Boys' schools in New South Wales
Educational institutions established in 1891
Junior School Heads Association of Australia Member Schools
Metropolitan Catholic Colleges Sports Association
1891 establishments in Australia
Lewisham, New South Wales
Congregation of Christian Brothers primary schools in Australia